Major-General Thomas Patrick David Scott,  (1905 – 30 July 1976) was a senior British Army officer.

Military career
Thomas Scott was born in Punjab Province (British India) in 1905, the son of Thomas Edwin Scott, who was an officer in the British Indian Army. Scott was sent to England where he was educated at Blundell's School before he entered the Royal Military College, Sandhurst, from where he was commissioned as a second lieutenant into the Royal Irish Fusiliers on 30 August 1924, alongside Kendal Chavasse.

The outbreak of the Second World War found Scott as a student at the Staff College, Camberley, with Chavasse as one of his fellow students. He briefly became brigade major of the 147th Infantry Brigade. He became commanding officer of the 1st Battalion, Royal Irish Fusiliers in Tunisia in 1942 and went on to be commander of 12th Brigade in North Africa in July 1943, commander of 128th Brigade in Italy in November 1943 and finally commander of 38th Infantry Brigade in Italy in February 1944. His service in the war was recognised with his appointment as Commander of the Order of the British Empire. He was also appointed a companion of the Distinguished Service Order with bar.

After the war he became commandant of the Senior Officers' School, Sheerness in 1948, commander of 107th (Ulster) Brigade in 1950 and Deputy Adjutant-General Middle East Land Forces in 1952. He went on to be training advisor to the Pakistan Army in 1954 and General Officer Commanding 42nd (Lancashire) Division in 1956. He was appointed a Companion of the Order of the Bath in the 1956 Birthday Honours before retiring in 1959.

Scott served as colonel of The Royal Irish Fusiliers from 1960 to 1968 and as Lord Lieutenant of County Fermanagh from 1971 to 1976.

References

Further reading
Obituary of Major-General T. P. D. Scott, The Times, Friday, 6 August 1976 (pg. 14; Issue 59775; col F)

Further reading

External links
Pat Scott CB CBE DSO* | Royal Irish - Virtual Military Gallery Major General T. P. D. Scott
Generals of World War II

 

|-
 

1905 births
1976 deaths
High Sheriffs of Tyrone
People educated at Blundell's School
Graduates of the Royal Military College, Sandhurst
Royal Irish Fusiliers officers
Commanders of the Order of the British Empire
Companions of the Order of the Bath
Companions of the Distinguished Service Order
British Army major generals
Lord-Lieutenants of Fermanagh
British Army brigadiers of World War II
Graduates of the Staff College, Camberley
People from Punjab, India
Commandants of the Senior Officers' School, Sheerness
Military personnel of British India
British people in colonial India